McClary House is a historic home located at Leipsic, Kent County, Delaware.  It dates to the mid-19th century, and is a two-story, gable roofed timber-frame vernacular dwelling on a brick foundation.  It was built as a hall-and-parlor plan house and retains an interior gable end chimney at either end of the structure.

It was listed on the National Register of Historic Places in 1983.

References

Houses on the National Register of Historic Places in Delaware
Houses in Kent County, Delaware
National Register of Historic Places in Kent County, Delaware
Leipsic, Delaware